The Roman Catholic Diocese of Nnewi is a diocese located in the city of Nnewi in the Ecclesiastical province of Onitsha in Nigeria.

History
 November 28, 2001: Established as Diocese of Nnewi from the Metropolitan Archdiocese of Onitsha

Special churches
The Cathedral is Cathedral of Our Lady of Assumption in Nnewi.

Bishops
 Bishops of Nnewi (Roman rite)
 Bishop Hilary Paul Odili Okeke (since November 9, 2001)

Other priest of this diocese who became bishop
Jude Thaddeus Okolo, appointed nuncio and titular archbishop in 2008

See also
www.nnewidiocese.org information page
Roman Catholicism in Nigeria

References

Sources
 GCatholic.org Information
 Catholic Hierarchy

Roman Catholic dioceses in Nigeria
Christian organizations established in 2001
Roman Catholic dioceses and prelatures established in the 21st century
2001 establishments in Nigeria
Roman Catholic Ecclesiastical Province of Onitsha